In enzymology, an acetylputrescine deacetylase is an enzyme that catalyzes the chemical reaction

N-acetylputrescine + H2O  acetate + putrescine

Thus, the two substrates of this enzyme are N-acetylputrescine and H2O, whereas its two products are acetate and putrescine.

This enzyme belongs to the family of hydrolases, those acting on carbon-nitrogen bonds other than peptide bonds, specifically in linear amides.  The systematic name of this enzyme class is N-acetylputrescine acetylhydrolase. This enzyme participates in urea cycle and metabolism of amino groups.

References

 

EC 3.5.1
Enzymes of unknown structure